Aciculopsora is a genus of lichens in the family Ramalinaceae. It was circumscribed by lichenologists André Aptroot and Marie Trest in 2006.

Species
Aciculopsora cinerea 
Aciculopsora longispora 
Aciculopsora srilankensis 

The taxon Aciculopsora salmonea , originally assigned as the type species of the genus, was later determined to be synonymous with Aciculopsora longispora.

References

Ramalinaceae
Lichen genera
Lecanorales genera
Taxa named by André Aptroot
Taxa described in 2006